Typhoon Bilis, known in the Philippines as Typhoon Isang, was the strongest tropical cyclone in the western Pacific during 2000 and wrought considerable damage in Taiwan and China in August of that year. The tenth named storm of the season, Bilis originated from an area of disturbed weather that developed into a tropical depression southeast of Guam on August 18. Situated within an environment highly conductive for continued tropical development, the depression strengthened into a tropical storm a day after formation; Bilis was upgraded to typhoon status on August 20 as it maintained a northwest course. At the same intensity, Bilis made landfall on Taiwan the following day. Despite its short stint over land, Bilis was greatly weakened, and made a brief track over the Taiwan Strait before its final landfall on China's Fujian Province early the next day. Moving inland into Mainland China, Bilis quickly weakened, and was only a tropical depression later that day; the depression diffused into a remnant low on August 25. These remnants tracked northeast across the Yellow Sea before dissipating in the Korean Peninsula on August 27.

Meteorological history

The predecessor to Typhoon Bilis began as a developing area of disturbed weather well south-southeast of Guam on August 15. Satellite analysis revealed a broad low-pressure area associated with the developing convection. Within an area supportive of tropical cyclogenesis, the disturbance gradually organized and intensified. At 0600 UTC on August 17, the Joint Typhoon Warning Center (JTWC) began classifying the system as a tropical depression. The Japan Meteorological Agency (JMA) followed suit the following day at 1200 UTC. Tracking northwestward, the favorable conditions allowed the depression to quickly strengthen and attain tightly wrapped rainbands, prompting the JMA to upgrade the system to tropical storm status at 0600 UTC on August 19, thus designating the storm with the name Bilis.

This period of rapid strengthening continued throughout the day's course, with the system reaching severe tropical storm intensity twelve hours after naming and then typhoon intensity at 1200 UTC on August 20. Water vapor satellite imagery at the time indicated that Bilis maintained a well-organized outflow pattern. As a result of its rapid intensification, Bilis grew in size, exhibiting a behavior typical of tropical cyclones originating from the northwest Pacific monsoon trough. In addition, the typhoon developed an eye early on August 20, though in its initial stages the eye was irregular in shape. At 1200 UTC on August 21, the JTWC determined Bilis to have reached super typhoon intensity.. By this point Bilis' eye had become cloud-free and well defined. The typhoon maintained this intensity with little fluctuation for roughly the ensuing eighteen hours as it tracked northwest. Early on August 22, microwave imagery indicated concentric eyewalls, a sign of a possible eyewall replacement cycle.

Still at peak intensity, Bilis made landfall on the coast of southern Taiwan at 1400 UTC on August 22. Concurrently, the storm's internal structure began to show signs of disruption, and its eye began to shrink. The typhoon accelerated over the island, and as such emerged into the Taiwan Strait no longer than five or six hours after landfall. Despite the short stint over land, Bilis had greatly weakened, and was only a minimal typhoon upon its reentry over water. However, there was a large discrepancy between JMA and JTWC intensity estimates, with the latter suggesting that Bilis had only weakened slightly. Nonetheless, the typhoon made its final landfall Jinjiang, Fujian at 0300 UTC on August 24. This greatly weakened Bilis, and three hours later the JMA downgraded it as a tropical storm. Shortly after landfall, the weakening tropical cyclone became quasi-stationary just inland of Mainland China. By this point convection was intermittent and short-lived, and at 1200 UTC the JMA classified the system as a tropical depression. Though the JTWC discontinued its monitoring activities, the depression began to assume a northerly course on August 24. At 1200 UTC the next day, the depression was determined to have diffused into a remnant low while still inland. Bilis' remnants continued to track northeast, across the Yellow Sea, and dissipated on August 27 shortly after entering the Korean Peninsula.

Preparations and impact

Taiwan
In preparation for Bilis, offices were closed across the island. In addition to the closure of businesses, flights to and from the island were rescheduled, and a typhoon relief center was established. Due to the threat of landslides, a landslide warning was issued for Taiwan. Though the storm had not yet made landfall, one person was killed in Taipei on August 22 after they were buried by a landslide triggered by the impending typhoon; this accounted for the first fatality caused by Bilis. Along with flight rescheduling, numerous airports were closed, and the Taiwan Stock Exchange was set to close on August 23. Meanwhile, hospitals extended service times in anticipation for patient admittance. Taiwanese coast guard members regulated fishing activity due to the threat of deadly wave action. The Port of Kaohsiung was closed throughout the duration of the storm. Due to the heightened demand for vegetables in the lead-up to the storm, the cost of such foods increased by 20 to 30 percent.

Bilis was a highly destructive tropical cyclone for Taiwan. Damage to the island's agricultural, fishing, and forestry industries amounted to US$133.5 million. The typhoon caused 14 fatalities and injured an additional 80 people. Power outages adversely impacted approximately 600,000 households, and 400 homes across Taiwan were destroyed. Several hundred thousand families experienced water shortage following the storm. In Cheng-Kung, a weather station recorded a  wind gust, which broke the station's anemometer. A single landslide in the town of Jenai buried nine farmers. Tens of thousands of people were displaced during the storm, and moved into evacuation shelters set up by the government. Eight people shooting a film on the outskirts of Kaohsiung became stranded and thus improvised a shelter to ride out the storm. In eastern Hualien County, 250 houses succumbed to strong winds. The winds also felled trees and blew light vehicles around, blocking roads. Heavy rainfall associated with Bilis flooded roughly 40,000 ha (100,000 ac) of orchards and rice paddies. Following Bilis' passage of Taiwan, a magnitude 5.7 earthquake struck the island, exacerbating the already worsened conditions.

Mainland China

Preparations for Typhoon Bilis on the Chinese mainland began on August 22, when the Xiamen Meteorological Observatory issued a warning for Fujian Province. The typhoon was anticipated to be the worst storm to affect Xiamen so far in 2000. As was the case in Taiwan, all three airports in the province were closed, and ferry service was suspended in preparation for the storm. Likewise, Xiamen Airlines cancelled all scheduled flights.

Despite becoming a weaker storm upon its landfall in China as opposed to its landfall on Taiwan, Bilis caused more fatalities and accrued a greater damage cost in China. Economic losses in China totaled US$534 million, with most of the losses occurring in Fujian Province. A total of 57 people were killed, though an additional 1,077 people were either wounded or went missing. Due to felled trees, a railway line from Fuzhou to Mawei blocked rail service. Bilis spawned several tornadoes in the area of Yueqing, ravaging four villages and destroying 20 buildings.

Elsewhere
As a developing disturbance, the precursor to Bilis dropped heavy rain on Guam on August 18. After becoming a tropical cyclone, Bilis' outer rainbands dropped heavy rainfall on Okinawa Prefecture in the Ryukyu Islands. While a weakening remnant system, Bilis caused torrential precipitation across South Korea. At Kunsan Air Base,  of rain was recorded over a 48-hour period; this two-day total was over three times the August average for the location.

See also

Typhoon Nepartak (2016)
Typhoon Jangmi (2008)
Typhoon Andy (1982)
Typhoon Sepat

Notes

References

External links

JMA General Information of Typhoon Bilis (0010) from Digital Typhoon
JMA Best Track Data (Graphics) of Typhoon Bilis (0010)
JMA Best Track Data (Text)
JTWC Best Track Data of Super Typhoon 18W (Bilis)
18W.BILIS from the U.S. Naval Research Laboratory

Typhoons in Taiwan
Typhoons in China
2000 Pacific typhoon season
2000 in Taiwan
2000 disasters in China
Typhoons
Bilis